Rafith Rodríguez Lleneres (born 1 June 1989 in El Bagre), is a Colombian athlete competing predominantly in the 800 meters. His personal best in the event is 1:44.31 achieved in 2011 in Belém.

Personal bests
400 m: 45.62 –Trujillo, Peru, 26 November 2013
800 m: 1:44.31 – Belém, Brazil, 15 May 2011
1500 m: 3:42.75 – Santiago, Chile, 14 March 2014

International competitions

References

Sports reference biography
Tilastopaja biography

1989 births
Living people
Colombian male middle-distance runners
Pan American Games silver medalists for Colombia
Athletes (track and field) at the 2011 Pan American Games
Olympic athletes of Colombia
Athletes (track and field) at the 2012 Summer Olympics
Athletes (track and field) at the 2016 Summer Olympics
World Athletics Championships athletes for Colombia
Sportspeople from Valle del Cauca Department
Pan American Games medalists in athletics (track and field)
Athletes (track and field) at the 2018 South American Games
South American Games gold medalists for Colombia
South American Games silver medalists for Colombia
South American Games bronze medalists for Colombia
South American Games medalists in athletics
Central American and Caribbean Games silver medalists for Colombia
Central American and Caribbean Games bronze medalists for Colombia
Competitors at the 2010 Central American and Caribbean Games
Competitors at the 2014 Central American and Caribbean Games
Competitors at the 2018 Central American and Caribbean Games
Central American and Caribbean Games medalists in athletics
Medalists at the 2015 Pan American Games
20th-century Colombian people
21st-century Colombian people